Rajya Sabha elections were held in 2000, to elect members of the Rajya Sabha, Indian Parliament's upper chamber. The elections were held  to elect respectively 3 seats from Delhi and 1 seat from Sikkim, 58 members from 15 states  and 3 members from Kerala for the Council of States, the Rajya Sabha.

Elections
Elections were held in 2000 to elect members from various states.
The list is incomplete.

Members elected
The following members are elected in the elections held in 2000. They are members for the term 2000-2006 and retire in year 2006, except in case of the resignation or death before the term.

State - Member - Party

Bye-elections
The following bye elections were held in the year 2000.

State - Member - Party

 Bye-elections were held on 20/01/2000 for vacancy from Karnataka and Jammu Kashmir  due to resignations of seating members S M Krishna on 14.10.1999 with term ending on 09.04.2002 and Dr  Karan Singh on 12.08.1999  with term ending on 29 November 2002. From Karnataka K. C. Kondaiah of INC became member.
 Bye-elections were held on 20/01/2000 for vacancy from Tamil Nadu  due to resignations of seating members R.K. Kumar on 03.10.1999 with term ending on 02.04.2002 and  T.M. Venkatachalam on 02.12.1999  with term ending on 02.04.2002.
 Bye-elections were held on 29/03/2000 for vacancy from Jammu Kashmir and Bihar due to resignation of seating member Dr  Karan Singh on 12.08.1999  with term ending on 29 November 2002 and death of seating member Jagdambi Mandal on 13 January 2000  with term ending on 09.04.2002. 
 Bye-elections were held on 21/09/2000 for vacancy from Sikkim due to death of seating member K G Bhutia on 12.8.2000 with term ending on 23 February 2006.

References

2000 elections in India
2000